Josh Sweat (born March 29, 1997) is an American football defensive end for the Philadelphia Eagles of the National Football League (NFL). He played college football at Florida State.

High school career 
A native of Chesapeake, Virginia, Sweat attended Oscar F. Smith High School where he was teammates with Andrew Brown. In his junior year, he recorded 94 tackles and helped Oscar Smith to march undefeated into the 2013 VHSL 6A state championship game, where they were upset by Centreville High School 35–6. In off-season football camps, Sweat impressed with his athleticism and triggered comparisons to Jadeveon Clowney.

Starting his senior year as the top-rated prospect in the country by ESPN, Sweat registered 25 tackles, 11 tackles for loss, and eight sacks in the first two games of the season. During the third game of the season, against Western Branch High School, Sweat suffered a season-ending injury as he dislocated his knee and tore his ACL. He underwent reconstructive surgery in New York performed by New York Giants team physician Russell Warren, before graduating from Oscar Smith in December 2014 to enroll early in college.

Initially being regarded the top prospect of his class, Sweat fell in the rankings after his injury. He dropped to No. 11 in ESPN's final ranking of the class of 2015, but retained his five-star status. Sweat committed to Florida State over offers from Virginia Tech, Georgia, Ohio State, and Oregon.

College career 
Sweat played college football at Florida State. As a freshman in 2015, Sweat played 12 games with 41 tackles, 5 sacks, an interception, 2 passes defended, and 3 fumble recoveries. As a sophomore in 2016, Sweat played 11 games with 41 tackles, 7 sacks, a pass defended, and a fumble recovery. As a junior in 2017, Sweat played 12 games with 56 tackles, 5.5 sacks, and 3 passes defended. On January 4, 2018, Sweat announced that he would forgo his senior year and enter the draft.

Professional career 
At the 2018 NFL Combine, Sweat ranked first among defensive linemen in 40-yard dash and vertical jump.

Sweat was drafted by the Philadelphia Eagles in the fourth round (130th overall) in the 2018 NFL Draft. The 130th overall pick was acquired by the Eagles in a trade that sent Sam Bradford to the Minnesota Vikings. He was placed on injured reserve on December 11, 2018.

In 2020, Sweat played in 14 games with three starts, recording six sacks, 38 tackles, and three forced fumbles. He was placed on injured reserve on December 26, 2020.

On September 18, 2021, Sweat agreed to a three-year, $40 million extension with the Philadelphia Eagles. A few months later, he was named to his first Pro Bowl, replacing Nick Bosa who was unable to attend due to an injury. Sweat missed the Eagles' Wild Card matchup against the Tampa Bay Buccaneers after undergoing surgery, an emergency procedure to address a "life-threatening" situation.

In 2022, Sweat recorded 48 tackles, 11 sacks, 1 forced fumble, 1 interception and 1 touchdown. Sweat helped the Eagles reach Super Bowl LVII. In the Super Bowl, Sweat recorded 1 tackle in the Eagles 38-35 loss to the Kansas City Chiefs.

NFL statistics

Regular Season

Playoffs

References

External links 
 Florida State Seminoles bio

1997 births
Living people
Players of American football from Virginia
Sportspeople from Chesapeake, Virginia
American football defensive ends
Florida State Seminoles football players
Philadelphia Eagles players